The Best of The Jets is the first greatest hits album by Tongan-American family band The Jets, released on July 13th, 1990, by MCA Records.

It featured four new songs, including "Special Kinda Love", "Sendin' Out a Message", "Forever In My Life" and "Another You", as well as a compilation of their greatest hits ("Crush on You", "Sendin' All My Love", "You Got It All", "Rocket 2 U", "Cross My Broken Heart" and "Make It Real"). This first greatest hits package excluded hits such as "You Better Dance", "The Same Love", and "Somebody to Love Me" while other tracks such as "I Do You" and "Private Number" (among others) were included on import versions.

Track listing
 "Special Kinda Love" – 4:32
 "Forever in My Life" – 5:15
 "Crush on You" – 4:31
 "Curiosity" – 4:58
 "Sendin' All My Love" – 4:32
 "You Got It All" – 4:09
 "Rocket 2 U" – 4:18
 "Sendin' Out a Message" – 4:00
 "La-La (Means I Love You)" (1990 remix) – 3:50
 "Cross My Broken Heart" – 4:07
 "Another You" – 4:25
 "Make It Real" – 4:18
 "Special Kinda Love" (Vogue extended club version) – 9:00

Singles released
"Special Kinda Love" – #83 US R&B

The Jets (band) albums
1990 greatest hits albums